The 2016–17 IUPUI Jaguars men's basketball team represented Indiana University – Purdue University Indianapolis during the 2016–17 NCAA Division I men's basketball season. The Jaguars, led by third-year head coach Jason Gardner, played their home games at Indiana Farmers Coliseum in Indianapolis, Indiana as members of The Summit League. They finished the season 14–18, 7–9 in Summit League play to finish in seventh place. They defeated North Dakota State in the quarterfinals of The Summit League tournament to advance to the semifinals where they lost to Omaha.

This was the Jaguars' final season as a member of the Summit League as the school announced on June 28, 2017 that it would be joining the Horizon League effective July 1, 2017.

Previous season
The Jaguars finished the 2015–16 season 13–19, 9-7 in Summit League play to finish in fourth place. They lost to North Dakota State in the quarterfinals of The Summit League tournament.

Roster

Schedule and results

|-
!colspan=9 style="| Exhibition

|-
!colspan=9 style=| Non-conference regular season

|-
!colspan=9 style=| Summit League regular season 

|-
!colspan=9 style=| The Summit League tournament

References

IUPUI Jaguars men's basketball seasons
IUPUI
2016 in sports in Indiana
2017 in sports in Indiana